Roman Salazar (born February 21, 1988) is an American professional mixed martial artist currently competing in the Bantamweight division of Bellator.

Background
Born and raised in raised in the small town of Mammoth, Arizona, Salazar worked for a while after finishing high school as a cable technician before shifting his focus to mixed martial arts.

Mixed martial arts career

Early career
Salazar began competing in amateur fights in 2007 as a lightweight before turning professional in 2009. He competed in several different regional promotions across Arizona where he was able to compile a record of 9 - 2.

On the heels of his first round submission victory over Jose Carbajal in September 2014, Salazar signed with the Ultimate Fighting Championship.

Ultimate Fighting Championship
Salazar made his promotional debut as a short notice replacement against Mitch Gagnon on October 4, 2014, at UFC Fight Night 54, filling in for an injured Rob Font.  He lost the fight via submission in the first round.

Salazar faced Norifumi Yamamoto on February 28, 2015, at UFC 184.  The bout was declared a no contest after an accidental eye poke by Yamamoto rendered Salazar unable to continue midway through the second round.

Salazar faced Marlon Vera on August 8, 2015, at UFC Fight Night 73. He lost the fight via submission in the second round  and was subsequently released from the promotion.

Bellator MMA

Salazar faced James Gallagher at Bellator:Dublin on September 27, 2019, but was defeated early in round one by submission (Guillotine choke).

Championships and accomplishments
Iron Boy MMA
IBMMA Bantamweight Championship (one time)

Mixed martial arts record

|-
|Win
|align=center|14–10 (1)
|Cody Huard
|KO (kick to the body)
|Road to ONE: RUF 41
|
|align=center|3
|align=center|2:54
|Phoenix, Arizona, United States
|
|-
|Loss
|align=center|13–10 (1)
|James Gallagher
|Submission (guillotine choke)
|Bellator 227
|
|align=center|1
|align=center|0:35
|Dublin, Ireland
|
|-
|Loss
|align=center|13–9 (1)
|Mario Israel
|Decision (Split)
|LFA 72
|
|align=center|3
|align=center|5:00
|Phoenix, Arizona, United States
|
|-
|Win
|align=center|13–8 (1)
|Evan DeLong
|Decision (Unanimous)
|Iron Boy MMA 14
|
|align=center|3
|align=center|5:00
|Phoenix, Arizona, United States
|
|-
|Loss
|align=center|12–8 (1)
|Eduardo Alvarado Osuna
|TKO (punches)
|Combate 22
|
|align=center|1
|align=center|4:14
|Phoenix, Arizona, United States
|
|-
|Loss
|align=center|12–7 (1)
|Casey Kenney
|Decision (unanimous)
|LFA 44: Frincu vs. Aguilera
|
|align=center|3
|align=center|5:00
|Phoenix, Arizona, United States
|
|-
|Win
|align=center|12–6 (1)
|Federico Betancourt
|TKO (punches)
|Iron Boy MMA 10
|
|align=center|2
|align=center|0:34
|Phoenix, Arizona, United States
|
|-
|Win
|align=center|11–6 (1)
|Joey Trevino
|TKO (punches)
|Iron Boy MMA 8
|
|align=center|1
|align=center|1:28
|Phoenix, Arizona, United States
|
|-
|Loss
|align=center|10–6 (1)
|Ricky Palacios
|Decision (split)
|Combate 13
|
|align=center|3
|align=center|5:00
|Tucson, Arizona, United States
|
|-
|Win
|align=center|10–5 (1)
|Gilberto Aguilar
|Decision (unanimous)
|WFF: World Fighting Federation 32
|
|align=center|3
|align=center|5:00
|Chandler, Arizona, United States
|
|-
|Loss
|align=center|9–5 (1)
|Ed West
|Decision (unanimous)
|Aggression Session 3 - Another One
|
|align=center|3
|align=center|5:00
|Scottsdale, Arizona, United States
|
|-
|Loss
|align=center|9–4 (1)
|Marlon Vera
|Submission (triangle armbar)
|UFC Fight Night: Teixeira vs. Saint Preux
|
|align=center|2
|align=center|2:15
|Nashville, Tennessee, United States
|
|-
|NC
|align=center| 9–3 (1)
| Norifumi Yamamoto
|No Contest (accidental eye poke)
| UFC 184
| 
|align=center|2
|align=center|2:37
| Los Angeles, California, United States
|
|-
| Loss
|align=center| 9–3
|Mitch Gagnon
| Submission (rear-naked choke)
|UFC Fight Night: MacDonald vs. Saffiedine
|
|align=center|1
|align=center|2:06
|Halifax, Nova Scotia, Canada
|
|-
| Win
|align=center| 9–2
|Jose Carbajal
| Submission (guillotine choke)
|WFF 16
|
|align=center|1
|align=center|2:06
|Chandler, Arizona, United States
|
|-
| Win
|align=center| 8–2
|Carlos Ochoa
| Submission (rear-naked choke) 
|WFF 14
|
|align=center|1
|align=center|2:09
|Chandler, Arizona, United States
|
|-
| Win
|align=center| 7–2
|Joe Madrid
| Decision (unanimous)
|WFF 12
|
|align=center|3
|align=center|5:00
|Tucson, Arizona, United States
|
|-
| Win
|align=center| 6–2
|Michael Parker
| Decision (unanimous)
|WFF 11
|
|align=center|3
|align=center|5:00
|Tucson, Arizona, United States
|
|-
| Loss
|align=center| 5–2
|Anthony Birchak
| TKO (punches)
|Coalition of Combat - Clash of the Titans
|
|align=center|3
|align=center|1:38
|Phoenix, Arizona, United States
|
|-
| Win
|align=center| 5–1
|Michael Sharpneck
| TKO (punches)
|RUF MMA - Cage Rage on the River
|
|align=center|1
|align=center|0:31
|Parker, Arizona, United States
|
|-
| Win
|align=center| 4–1
|Brett Shoenfelt
| DQ (illegal knee)
|UPN 3
|
|align=center|3
|align=center|1:51
|San Manuel, Arizona, United States
|
|-
| Win
|align=center| 3–1
|Ramon Aleman
| KO (punch)
|UPN 2
|
|align=center|1
|align=center|0:20
|San Manuel, Arizona, United States
|
|-
| Win
|align=center| 2–1
|Ruben S. Gonzales
| TKO (punches)
|UPN 1
|
|align=center|1
|align=center|2:23
|San Manuel, Arizona, United States
|
|-
| Loss
|align=center| 1–1
|Sammy Ciurdar
| Decision (split)
|WFF 1
|
|align=center|3
|align=center|5:00
|Tucson, Arizona, United States
|
|-
| Win
|align=center| 1–0
|Robert Gainey
| Submission (guillotine choke)
|RITC 134 
|
|align=center|2
|align=center|2:20
|Tucson, Arizona, United States
|
|-

See also
 List of current UFC fighters
 List of male mixed martial artists

References

External links

1988 births
Living people
American male mixed martial artists
American mixed martial artists of Mexican descent
Mixed martial artists from Arizona
People from Pinal County, Arizona
Sportspeople from the Phoenix metropolitan area
Bantamweight mixed martial artists
Ultimate Fighting Championship male fighters